The 2021 New York Yankees season was the 119th season for the New York Yankees.

The Yankees entered the 2021 season expecting to contend for the World Series. The Yankees' Opening Day was on April 1 against the Toronto Blue Jays at Yankee Stadium with 20% capacity. The full crowd at Globe Life Field got to witness starting pitcher Corey Kluber throw a no-hitter against the Texas Rangers on May 19. The Yankees turned an 'around-the-horn' triple play on May 21 against the Chicago White Sox starting with third baseman Gio Urshela to second baseman Rougned Odor and then to first baseman Luke Voit.

During a game against the Toronto Blue Jays in Buffalo, New York, on June 17, the Yankees turned the first 1-3-6-2-5-6 triple play in major league history. The franchise had never turned more than one triple play in a season. Then on June 20, with 100% full crowd capacity, the Yankees turned their record-tying third triple play of the season to strand the go-ahead run in the top of the ninth inning, shutting down the Oakland Athletics and winning the game.

The Yankees underperformed throughout the regular season and were 41–41, with 80 games left to play on July 4. The Yankees went 51–29 in their final 80 games including a season-high 13 game winning streak, their longest winning streak since 1961. On October 3, the Yankees clinched a Wild Card berth with a 1–0 win against the Tampa Bay Rays. The Yankees finished the regular season with a 92–70 record and qualified for the postseason as the fifth seed in the American League (AL), before losing to the fourth-seed Boston Red Sox in the AL Wild Card Game at Fenway Park on October 5, their fifth consecutive playoff exit.

From September 6–9, the Yankees never led in the 4-game series against the Blue Jays, the first time since 1924 they never led in a 4-game series in the regular season.

Offseason

Transactions

2020

December 2 – Luis Cessa re-signs with the Yankees for a 1-year, $1 million contract.

2021
January 6 – Acquired outfielder Greg Allen from the Cleveland Indians in exchange for James Reeves.
January 24 – Acquired starting pitcher Jameson Taillon from the Pittsburgh Pirates for four prospects (Miguel Yajure, Roansy Contreras, Maikol Escotto, and Canaan Smith).
January 27 – acquired Cy Young right-handed starting pitcher Corey Kluber from the Texas Rangers signs a one-year, $11 million contract with the Yankees.
January 27 – DJ LeMahieu re-signs with the Yankees to a six-year, $90 million contract in free agency.
February 10 – Signed sidearm right-handed pitcher Darren O'Day (coming off a season with the Atlanta Braves) to a one-year, $1.75 million contract while in free agency.
February 22 – Brett Gardner re-signs with the Yankees to a one-year, $4 million contract while in free agency.
February 23 – Acquired left-handed pitcher Justin Wilson from the New York Mets to a one-year, $4 million contract while in free agency.

Regular season

Transactions

2021
April 6 – Acquired second-baseman Rougned Odor from the Texas Rangers in a trade along with cash considerations and minor-league outfielders Antonio Cabello and Josh Stowers.
April 27 – Acquired left-handed pitcher Wandy Peralta and infielder Connor Cannon from the San Francisco Giants in exchange for outfielder Mike Tauchman.
July 1 – Acquired outfielder Tim Locastro from the Arizona Diamondbacks for minor league right-handed pitcher Keegan Curtis
July 26 – Acquired right-handed relief pitcher Clay Holmes from the Pittsburgh Pirates for minor league infielders Diego Castillo and Hoy Jun Park.
July 27 – Traded relievers Luis Cessa and Justin Wilson to the Cincinnati Reds for a player to be named later.
July 29 – Acquired outfielder Joey Gallo and left-handed relief pitcher Joely Rodríguez from the Texas Rangers for minor leaguer prospects: second basemen Ezequiel Duran and Trevor Hauver, right-handed pitcher Glenn Otto and infielder Josh Smith.
July 29 – Acquired first baseman Anthony Rizzo from the Chicago Cubs for minor leaguers right-handed pitcher Alexander Vizcaino and outfielder Kevin Alcantara. The Yankees also acquired cash considerations ($5.5 million), the remaining balance of Rizzo's $16.5 million salary this season.
July 30 – Acquired starting left-handed pitcher Andrew Heaney from the Los Angeles Angels and cash considerations for minor league right-handed pitcher Janson Junk and Elvis Peguero.

Season standings

American League East

American League Wild Card

Record against opponents

Yankees team leaders

Updated through game of September 30.

 Minimum 3.1 plate appearances per team games played
AVG qualified batters: Judge, Stanton, LeMahieu

 Minimum 1 inning pitched per team games played
ERA & WHIP qualified pitchers: Cole, Cortes

Game log
On November 23, MLB announced that the Yankees would face the Chicago White Sox in the first MLB at Field of Dreams game in Dyersville, Iowa on August 12. This game was originally scheduled for August 13, 2020. Yankees went on to lose the game 9-8.

|- style="background:#fbb;"
| 1 || April 1 || Blue Jays || 2–3  || Romano (1–0) || Nelson (0–1) || Merryweather (1) || Yankee Stadium || 10,850 || 0–1
|- style="background:#bfb;"
| 2 || April 3 || Blue Jays || 5–3 || Loáisiga (1–0) || Stripling (0–1) || Green (1) || Yankee Stadium || 10,107 || 1–1
|- style="background:#fbb;"
| 3 || April 4 || Blue Jays || 1–3 || Borucki (1–0) || Germán (0–1) || Merryweather (2) || Yankee Stadium || 10,066 || 1–2
|- style="background:#bfb;"
| 4 || April 5 || Orioles || 7–0 || Montgomery (1–0) || López (0–1) || — || Yankee Stadium || 9,008 || 2–2
|- style="background:#bfb;"
| 5 || April 6 || Orioles || 7–2 || Cole (1–0) || Kremer (0–1) || — || Yankee Stadium || 9,404 || 3–2
|- style="background:#fbb;"
| 6 || April 7 || Orioles || 3–4  || Valdez (1–0) || Green (0–1) || Fry (1) || Yankee Stadium || 10,254 || 3–3
|- style="background:#fbb;"
| 7 || April 9 || @ Rays || 5–10 || Hill (1–0) || Kluber (0–1) || — || Tropicana Field || 9,021 || 3–4
|- style="background:#fbb;"
| 8 || April 10 || @ Rays || 0–4 || Kittredge (2–0) || Germán (0–2) || — || Tropicana Field || 6,270 || 3–5
|- style="background:#bfb;"
| 9 || April 11 || @ Rays || 8–4  || Chapman (1–0) || McHugh (0–1) || — || Tropicana Field || 6,965 || 4–5
|- style="background:#bfb;"
| 10 || April 12 || @ Blue Jays || 3–1 || Cole (2–0) || Ray (0–1) || Chapman (1) || TD Ballpark || 1,576 || 5–5
|- style="background:#fbb;"
| 11 || April 13 || @ Blue Jays || 3–7 || Ryu (1–1) || Taillon (0–1) || — || TD Ballpark || 1,550 || 5–6
|- style="background:#fbb;"
| 12 || April 14 || @ Blue Jays || 4–5 || Dolis (1–0) || Green (0–2) || — || TD Ballpark || 1,613 || 5–7
|- style="background:#fbb;"
| 13 || April 16 || Rays || 2–8 || Wacha (1–1) || Nelson (0–2) || — || Yankee Stadium || 10,202 || 5–8
|- style="background:#fbb;"
| 14 || April 17 || Rays || 3–6 || Glasnow (2–0) || Montgomery (1–1) || Castillo (4) || Yankee Stadium || 10,583 || 5–9
|- style="background:#fbb;"
| 15 || April 18 || Rays || 2–4 || Yarbrough (1–2) || Cole (2–1) || Springs (1) || Yankee Stadium || 10,606 || 5–10
|- style="background:#bfb;"
| 16 || April 20 || Braves || 3–1 || Loáisiga (2–0) || Matzek (0–2) || Chapman (2) || Yankee Stadium || 10,017 || 6–10
|- style="background:#fbb;"
| 17 || April 21 || Braves || 1–4 || Anderson (1–0) || Kluber (0–2) || — || Yankee Stadium || 9,634 || 6–11
|- style="background:#bfb;"
| 18 || April 22 || @ Indians || 6–3 || Germán (1–2) || Wittgren (0–1) || Chapman (3) || Progressive Field || 6,380 || 7–11
|- style="background:#bfb;"
| 19 || April 23 || @ Indians || 5–3 || Luetge (1–0) || Allen (1–3) || Chapman (4) || Progressive Field || 8,662 || 8–11
|- style="background:#bfb;"
| 20 || April 24 || @ Indians || 2–1 || Cole (3–1) || Bieber (2–2) || Loáisiga (1) || Progressive Field || 8,817 || 9–11
|- style="background:#fbb;"
| 21 || April 25 || @ Indians || 3–7 || Hentges (1–0) || Taillon (0–2) || — || Progressive Field || 8,766 || 9–12
|- style="background:#fbb;"
| 22 || April 26 || @ Orioles || 2–4 || Harvey (2–1) || García (0–1) || Valdez (5) || Camden Yards || 6,367 || 9–13
|- style="background:#bfb;"
| 23 || April 27 || @ Orioles || 5–1 || Kluber (1–2) || Zimmermann (1–3) || — || Camden Yards || 6,662 || 10–13
|- style="background:#bfb;"
| 24 || April 28 || @ Orioles || 7–0 || Germán (2–2) || Kremer (0–2) || — || Camden Yards || 7,338 || 11–13
|- style="background:#fbb;"
| 25 || April 29 || @ Orioles || 3–4  || Scott (1–2) || Loáisiga (2–1) || — || Camden Yards || 7,738 || 11–14
|- style="background:#bfb;"
| 26 || April 30 || Tigers || 10–0 || Cole (4–1) || Skubal (0–4) || — || Yankee Stadium || 9,523 || 12–14
|-

|- style="background:#bfb;"
| 27 || May 1 || Tigers || 6–4 || Taillon (1–2) || Turnbull (1–2) || Chapman (5) || Yankee Stadium || 10,015 || 13–14
|- style="background:#bfb;"
| 28 || May 2 || Tigers || 2–0 || Kluber (2–2) || Ureña (1–4) || Chapman (6) || Yankee Stadium || 10,021 || 14–14
|- style="background:#bfb;"
| 29 || May 4 || Astros || 7–3 || Luetge (2–0) || Bielak (1–1) || — || Yankee Stadium || 10,850 || 15–14
|- style="background:#bfb;"
| 30 || May 5 || Astros || 6–3 || Loáisiga (3–1) || Raley (0–2) || Chapman (7) || Yankee Stadium || 9,895 || 16–14
|- style="background:#fbb;"
| 31 || May 6 || Astros || 4–7 || Scrubb (1–0) || Green (0–3) || Pressly (5) || Yankee Stadium || 10,042 || 16–15
|- style="background:#fbb;"
| 32 || May 7 || Nationals || 4–11 || Finnegan (2–0) || Loáisiga (3–2) || — || Yankee Stadium || 10,010 || 16–16
|- style="background:#bfb;"
| 33 || May 8 || Nationals || 4–3  || Wilson (1–0) || Rainey (0–2) || — || Yankee Stadium || 10,850 || 17–16
|- style="background:#bfb;"
| 34 || May 9 || Nationals || 3–2 || Chapman (2–0) || Hand (2–1) || — || Yankee Stadium || 10,092 || 18–16
|- style="background:#bfb;"
| 35 || May 11 || @ Rays || 3–1 || Montgomery (2–1) || Patiño (1–1) || Chapman (8) || Tropicana Field || 5,441 || 19–16
|- style="background:#bfb;"
| 36 || May 12 || @ Rays || 1–0 || Cole (5–1) || Thompson (2–2) || Chapman (9) || Tropicana Field || 5,668 || 20–16
|- style="background:#fbb;"
| 37 || May 13 || @ Rays || 1–9 || Hill (2–1) || Taillon (1–3) || — || Tropicana Field || 6,229 || 20–17
|- style="background:#bfb;"
| 38 || May 14 || @ Orioles || 5–4 || Kluber (3–2) || Lakins (1–4) || Loáisiga (2) || Camden Yards || 10,809 || 21–17
|- style="background:#bfb;"
| 39 || May 15 || @ Orioles || 8–2 || Germán (3–2) || López (1–4) || — || Camden Yards || 10,767 || 22–17
|- style="background:#fbb;"
| 40 || May 16 || @ Orioles || 6–10 || Zimmermann (2–3) || King (0–1) || — || Camden Yards || 11,070 || 22–18
|- style="background:#fbb;"
| 41 || May 17 || @ Rangers || 2–5 || Lyles (2–3) || Cole (5–2) || Kennedy (11) || Globe Life Field || 28,040 || 22–19
|- style="background:#bfb;"
| 42 || May 18 || @ Rangers || 7–4 || Peralta (1–0) || Foltynewicz (1–4) || Chapman (10) || Globe Life Field || 26,522 || 23–19
|- style="background:#bfb;"
| 43 || May 19 || @ Rangers || 2–0 || Kluber (4–2) || Yang (0–1) || — || Globe Life Field || 31,689 || 24–19
|- style="background:#bfb;"
| 44 || May 20 || @ Rangers || 2–0 || Germán (4–2) || King (4–3) || Chapman (11) || Globe Life Field || 27,581 || 25–19
|- style="background:#bfb;"
| 45 || May 21 || White Sox || 2–1 || Chapman (3–0) || Marshall (1–2) || — || Yankee Stadium || 14,011 || 26–19
|- style="background:#bfb;"
| 46 || May 22 || White Sox || 7–0 || Cole (6–2) || Cease (2–1) || — || Yankee Stadium || 14,665 || 27–19
|- style="background:#bfb;"
| 47 || May 23 || White Sox || 5–4 || Chapman (4–0) || Bummer (0–3) || — || Yankee Stadium || 14,007 || 28–19
|- style="background:#fbb;"
| 48 || May 25 || Blue Jays || 2–6 || Matz (6–2) || Kluber (4–3) || — || Yankee Stadium || 12,025 || 28–20
|- style="background:#bbb;"
| — || May 26 || Blue Jays || colspan=7 | Postponed (Rain, Makeup May 27)
|- style="background:#fbb;"
| 49 || May 27  || Blue Jays || 0–2  || Manoah (1–0) || Germán (4–3) || Romano (2) || Yankee Stadium || N/A || 28–21
|- style="background:#bfb;"
| 50 || May 27  || Blue Jays || 5–3  || Loáisiga (4–2) || Ray (2–2) || Green (2) || Yankee Stadium || 14,056 || 29–21
|- style="background:#fbb;"
| 51 || May 28 || @ Tigers || 2–3  || Garcia (1–1) || Wilson (1–1) || — || Comerica Park || 8,000 || 29–22
|- style="background:#fbb;"
| 52 || May 29 || @ Tigers || 1–6 || Turnbull (4–2) || García (0–2) || — || Comerica Park || 8,000 || 29–23
|- style="background:#fbb;"
| 53 || May 30 || @ Tigers || 2–6 || Skubal (2–7) || King (0–2) || — || Comerica Park || 8,000 || 29–24
|- style="background:#fbb;"
| 54 || May 31 || Rays || 1–3 || Hill (4–2) || Taillon (1–4) || Feyereisen (3) || Yankee Stadium || 17,008 || 29–25
|-

|- style="background:#bfb;"
| 55 || June 1 || Rays || 5–3  || Cessa (1–0) || Kittredge (5–1) || — || Yankee Stadium || 12,537 || 30–25
|- style="background:#bfb;" 
| 56 || June 2 || Rays || 4–3 || Montgomery (3–1) || McClanahan (2–1) || Chapman (12) || Yankee Stadium || 13,824 || 31–25
|- style="background:#fbb;"
| 57 || June 3 || Rays || 2–9 || Yarbrough (3–3) || Cole (6–3) || — || Yankee Stadium || 12,614 || 31–26
|- style="background:#fbb;"
| 58 || June 4 || Red Sox || 2–5 || Eovaldi (7–2) || King (0–3) || Barnes (13) || Yankee Stadium || 18,040 || 31–27
|- style="background:#fbb;"
| 59 || June 5 || Red Sox || 3–7 || Whitlock (1–1) || Green (0–4) || Barnes (14) || Yankee Stadium || 20,019 || 31–28
|- style="background:#fbb;"
| 60 || June 6 || Red Sox || 5–6  || Barnes (2–1) || Cessa (1–1) || Valdéz (1) || Yankee Stadium || 19,103 || 31–29
|- style="background:#bfb;"
| 61 || June 8 || @ Twins || 8–4 || Loáisiga (5–2) || Rogers (2–3) || — || Target Field || 17,949 || 32–29
|- style="background:#bfb;"
| 62 || June 9 || @ Twins || 9–6 || Cole (7–3) || Dobnak (1–6) || — || Target Field || 17,078 || 33–29
|- style="background:#fbb;"
| 63 || June 10 || @ Twins || 5–7 || Robles (2–2) || Chapman (4–1) || — || Target Field || 17,728 || 33–30
|- style="background:#fbb;"
| 64 || June 12 || @ Phillies || 7–8  || Bradley (2–1) || Chapman (4–2) || — || Citizens Bank Park || 38,450 || 33–31
|- style="background:#fbb;"
| 65 || June 13 || @ Phillies || 0–7 || Nola (5–4) || Germán (4–4) || — || Citizens Bank Park || 38,512 || 33–32
|- style="background:#bfb;"
| 66 || June 15 || @ Blue Jays || 6–5 || Loáisiga (6–2) || Mayza (1–1) || Chapman (13) || Sahlen Field || 7,145 || 34–32
|- style="background:#bfb;"
| 67 || June 16 || @ Blue Jays || 3–2 || Cole (8–3) || Stripling (2–4) || Chapman (14) || Sahlen Field || 7,271 || 35–32
|- style="background:#bfb;"
| 68 || June 17 || @ Blue Jays || 8–4 || Green (1–4) || Castro (1–2) || — || Sahlen Field || 7,288 || 36–32
|- style="background:#fbb;"
| 69 || June 18 || Athletics || 3–5 || Kaprielian (4–1) || Peralta (3–2) || Trivino (12) || Yankee Stadium || 24,037 || 36–33
|- style="background:#bfb;"
| 70 || June 19 || Athletics || 7–5 || Green (2–4) || Luzardo (2–4) || Chapman (15) || Yankee Stadium || 23,985 || 37–33
|- style="background:#bfb;"
| 71 || June 20 || Athletics || 2–1 || Loáisiga (7–2) || Manaea (6–3) || Chapman (16) || Yankee Stadium || 27,807 || 38–33
|- style="background:#fbb;"
| 72 || June 22 || Royals || 5–6 || Brentz (2–0) || Loáisiga (7–3) || Holland (5) || Yankee Stadium || 21,130 || 38–34
|- style="background:#bfb;"
| 73 || June 23 || Royals || 6–5 || Chapman (5–2) || Holland (2–3) || — || Yankee Stadium || 25,032 || 39–34
|- style="background:#bfb;"
| 74 || June 24 || Royals || 8–1 || Taillon (2–4) || Keller (6–8) || — || Yankee Stadium || 21,350 || 40–34
|- style="background:#fbb;"
| 75 || June 25 || @ Red Sox || 3–5 || Whitlock (3–1) || Germán (4–5) || Barnes (16) || Fenway Park || 36,869 || 40–35
|- style="background:#fbb;"
| 76 || June 26 || @ Red Sox || 2–4 || Eovaldi (8–4) || Montgomery (3–2) || Ottavino (5) || Fenway Park || 36,857 || 40–36
|- style="background:#fbb;"
| 77 || June 27 || @ Red Sox || 2–9 || Rodríguez (6–4) || Cole (8–4) || — || Fenway Park || 34,507 || 40–37
|- style="background:#fbb;"
| 78 || June 28 || Angels || 3–5 || Suárez (3–1) || King (0–4) || Iglesias (14) || Yankee Stadium || 25,054 || 40–38
|- style="background:#bfb;"
| 79 || June 29 || Angels || 11–5 || Taillon (3–4) || Heaney (4–6) || — || Yankee Stadium || 23,152 || 41–38
|- style="background:#fbb;"
| 80 || June 30 || Angels || 8–11 || Mayers (2–3) || Luetge (2–1) || Iglesias (15) || Yankee Stadium || 30,714 || 41–39
|-

|- style="background:#bbb;" 
| — || July 1 || Angels || colspan=7 | Postponed (Rain, Makeup August 16)
|- style="background:#bbb;"
| — || July 2 || Mets || colspan=7 | Postponed (Rain, Makeup July 4)
|- style="background:#fbb;"
| 81 || July 3 || Mets || 3–8 || Walker (7–3) || Montgomery (3–3) || — || Yankee Stadium || 40,047 || 41–40
|- style="background:#fbb;"
| 82 || July 4  || Mets || 5–10  || Familia (3–1) || Chapman (5–3) || — || Yankee Stadium || 42,714 || 41–41
|- style="background:#bfb;"
| 83 || July 4  || Mets || 4–2 || Green (3–4) || Oswalt (1–1) || — || Yankee Stadium || 42,107 || 42–41
|- style="background:#bfb;"
| 84 || July 6 || @ Mariners || 12–1 || Taillon (4–4) || Sheffield (5–8) || — || T-Mobile Park || 16,547 || 43–41
|- style="background:#bfb;"
| 85 || July 7 || @ Mariners || 5–4 || Cessa (2–1) || Kikuchi (6–4) || Green (3) || T-Mobile Park || 17,205 || 44–41
|- style="background:#fbb;"
| 86 || July 8 || @ Mariners || 0–4 || Gilbert (3–2) || Montgomery (3–4) || — || T-Mobile Park || 17,254 || 44–42
|- style="background:#bfb;"
| 87 || July 9 || @ Astros || 4–0 || Luetge (3–1) || Odorizzi (3–4) || — || Minute Maid Park || 40,857 || 45–42
|- style="background:#bfb;"
| 88 || July 10 || @ Astros || 1–0 || Cole (9–4) || Greinke (8–3) || — || Minute Maid Park || 41,259 || 46–42
|- style="background:#fbb;"
| 89 || July 11 || @ Astros || 7–8 || Garza Jr. (1–2) || Green (3–5) || — || Minute Maid Park || 37,928 || 46–43
|- style=background:#bff
|colspan="10"|91st All-Star Game in Denver, Colorado
|- style="background:#bbb;"
| — || July 15 || Red Sox || colspan=7 | Postponed (COVID-19, Makeup August 17)
|- style="background:#fbb;"
| 90 || July 16 || Red Sox || 0–4 || Rodríguez (7–5) || Montgomery (3–5) || Houck (1) || Yankee Stadium || 40,130 || 46–44
|- style="background:#bfb;"
| 91 || July 17 || Red Sox || 3–1  || Cole (10–4) || Sawamura (4–1) || — || Yankee Stadium || 37,095 || 47–44
|- style="background:#bfb;"
| 92 || July 18 || Red Sox || 9–1 || Taillon (5–4) || Pérez (7–6) || — || Yankee Stadium || 40,309 || 48–44
|- style="background:#bfb;"
| 93 || July 20 || Phillies || 6–4 || Cessa (3–1) || Nola (6–6) || Chapman (17) || Yankee Stadium || 36,106 || 49–44
|- style="background:#bfb;"
| 94 || July 21 || Phillies || 6–5  || Kriske (1–0) || Suárez (4–3) || — || Yankee Stadium || 34,112 || 50–44
|- style="background:#fbb;"
| 95 || July 22 || @ Red Sox || 4–5  || Barnes (5–2) || Kriske (1–1) || — || Fenway Park || 34,761 || 50–45
|- style="background:#fbb;"
| 96 || July 23 || @ Red Sox || 2–6 || Ríos (3–0) || Cole (10–5) || — || Fenway Park || 34,922 || 50–46
|- style="background:#bfb;"
| 97 || July 24 || @ Red Sox || 4–3 || Taillon (5–4) || Ottavino (2–3) || Chapman (18) || Fenway Park || 35,136 || 51–46
|- style="background:#fbb;"
| 98 || July 25 || @ Red Sox || 4–5 || Workman (1–2) || Loáisiga (7–4) || Barnes (21) || Fenway Park || 32,009 || 51–47
|- style="background:#bfb;"
| 99 || July 27 || @ Rays || 4–3 || Montgomery (4–5) || McClanahan (4–4) || Chapman (19) || Tropicana Field || 12,678 || 52–47
|- style="background:#bfb;"
| 100 || July 28 || @ Rays || 3–1  || Green (4–5) || Fairbanks (3–4) || Chapman (20) || Tropicana Field || 11,525 || 53–47
|- style="background:#fbb;"
| 101 || July 29 || @ Rays || 0–14 || Patiño (2–2) || Cole (10–6) || — || Tropicana Field || 14,134 || 53–48
|- style="background:#bfb;"
| 102 || July 30 || @ Marlins || 3–1 || Taillon (7–4) || Thompson (2–4) || Chapman (21) || loanDepot Park || 18,462 || 54–48
|- style="background:#bfb;"
| 103 || July 31 || @ Marlins || 4–2 || Luetge (4–1) || Hess (2–1) || Loáisiga (3) || loanDepot Park || 25,767 || 55–48
|-

|- style="background:#bfb;"
| 104 || August 1 || @ Marlins || 3–1 || Rodríguez (2–3) || Bass (1–6) || Chapman (22) || loanDepot Park || 20,758 || 56–48
|- style="background:#fbb;"
| 105 || August 2 || Orioles || 1–7 || López (3–12) || Heaney (6–8) || — || Yankee Stadium || 28,879 || 56–49
|- style="background:#bfb;"
| 106 || August 3 || Orioles || 13–1 || Gil (1–0) || Wells (1–2) || — || Yankee Stadium || 30,815 || 57–49
|- style="background:#bfb;"
| 107 || August 4 || Orioles || 10–3 || Loáisiga (8–4) || Sulser (3–2) || — || Yankee Stadium || 30,055 || 58–49
|- style="background:#bfb;"
| 108 || August 5 || Mariners || 5–3 || Green (5–5) || Sewald (6–3) || Chapman (23) || Yankee Stadium || 33,211 || 59–49
|- style="background:#bfb;"
| 109 || August 6 || Mariners || 3–2  || Abreu (1–0) || Middleton (0–2) || — || Yankee Stadium || 43,180 || 60–49
|- style="background:#bfb;"
| 110 || August 7 || Mariners || 5–4 || Heaney (7–8) || Misiewicz (3–4) || Loáisiga (4) || Yankee Stadium || 35,165 || 61–49
|- style="background:#fbb;" 
| 111 || August 8 || Mariners || 0–2 || Sewald (7–3) || Luetge (4–2) || Steckenrider (4) || Yankee Stadium || 35,437 || 61–50
|- style="background:#bfb;" 
| 112 || August 9 || @ Royals || 8–6  || Holmes (4–2) || Holland (2–5) || Peralta (3) || Kauffman Stadium || 18,477 || 62–50
|- style="background:#fbb;" 
| 113 || August 10 || @ Royals || 4–8 || Staumont (2–2) || Cortés Jr. (0–1) || — || Kauffman Stadium || 18,218 || 62–51
|- style="background:#bfb;" 
| 114 || August 11 || @ Royals || 5–2 || Green (6–5) || Singer (3–8) ||Britton (1) || Kauffman Stadium ||13,748 || 63–51
|- style="background:#fbb;"
| 115 || August 12† || @ White Sox || 8–9 || Hendriks (7–2) || Britton (0–1) || — || Field of Dreams (Iowa)† || 7,832 || 63–52
|- style="background:#bfb;"
| 116 || August 14 || @ White Sox || 7–5  || Green (7–5) || Hendriks (7–3) || Abreu (1) || Guaranteed Rate Field || 38,477 || 64–52
|- style="background:#bfb;" 
| 117 || August 15 || @ White Sox || 5–3 || Cortés Jr. (1–1) || Giolito (9–9) || Peralta (4) || Guaranteed Rate Field || 37,696 || 65–52 
|- style="background:#bfb;" 
| 118 || August 16 || Angels || 2–1 || Cole (11–6) || Suárez (5–6) || Green (4) || Yankee Stadium || 37,010 || 66–52
|- style="background:#bfb;" 
| 119 || August 17  || Red Sox || 5–3  || Abreu (2–0) || Whitlock (4–2) || Loáisiga (5) || Yankee Stadium || 39,078 || 67–52
|- style="background:#bfb;" 
| 120 || August 17  || Red Sox || 2–0  || Peralta (4–2) || Eovaldi (10–8) || Green (5) || Yankee Stadium || 35,237 || 68–52
|- style="background:#bfb;" 
| 121 || August 18 || Red Sox || 5–2 || Heaney (8–8) || Pivetta (9–6) || Luetge (1) || Yankee Stadium || 39,166 || 69–52
|- style="background:#bfb;" 
| 122 || August 19 || Twins || 7–5 || Taillon (8–4) || Gant (4–7) || Green (6) || Yankee Stadium || 30,019 || 70–52
|- style="background:#bfb;"
| 123 || August 20 || Twins || 10–2 || Cortés Jr. (2–1) || Barnes (0–3) || — || Yankee Stadium || 39,124 || 71–52
|- style="background:#bfb;" 
| 124 || August 21 || Twins || 7–1 || Cole (12–6) || Maeda (6–5) || — || Yankee Stadium || 35,247 || 72–52
|- style="background:#bbb;" 
| — || August 22 || Twins || colspan=7 | Postponed (Hurricane Henri, Makeup September 13)
|- style="background:#bfb;"
| 125 || August 23 || @ Braves || 5–1 || Montgomery (5–5) || Ynoa (4–3) || — || Truist Park || 39,176 || 73–52
|- style="background:#bfb;"
| 126 || August 24 || @ Braves || 5–4 || Holmes (5–2) || Morton (12–5) || Peralta (5) || Truist Park || 37,426 || 74–52
|- style="background:#bfb;"
| 127 || August 26 || @ Athletics || 7–6 || Loáisiga (9–4) || Trivino (5–7) || Chapman (24) || Oakland Coliseum || 8,147 || 75–52
|- style="background:#bfb;"
| 128 || August 27 || @ Athletics || 8–2 || Cole (13–6) || Manaea (8–9) || — || Oakland Coliseum || 22,463 || 76–52
|- style="background:#fbb;" 
| 129 || August 28 || @ Athletics || 2–3 || Montas (10–9) || Cortés Jr. (2–2) || Romo (1) || Oakland Coliseum || 18,337 || 76–53
|- style="background:#fbb;" 
| 130 || August 29 || @ Athletics || 1–3 || Guerra (2–1) || Green (7–6) || Chafin (2) || Oakland Coliseum || 18,468 || 76–54
|- style="background:#fbb;" 
| 131 || August 30 || @ Angels || 7–8 || Guerra (5–2) || Peralta (4–3) || Iglesias (28) || Angel Stadium || 29,436 || 76–55
|- style="background:#fbb;"
| 132 || August 31 || @ Angels || 4–6 || Herget (1–1) || Taillon (8–5) || Iglesias (29) || Angel Stadium || 34,813 || 76–56
|-
| colspan=10 | 

|- style="background:#bfb;"
| 133 || September 1 || @ Angels || 4–1 || Cole (14–6) || Naughton (0–1) || Chapman (25) || Angel Stadium || 28,753 || 77–56
|- style="background:#bfb;" 
| 134 || September 3 || Orioles || 4–3  || Holmes (6–2) || Tate (0–6) || — || Yankee Stadium || 34,085 || 78–56
|- style="background:#fbb;" 
| 135 || September 4 || Orioles || 3–4 || Sulser (4–3) || Chapman (5–4) || — || Yankee Stadium || 34,571 || 78–57
|- style="background:#fbb;" 
| 136 || September 5 || Orioles || 7–8 || Diplán (1–0) || Heaney (8–9) || Wells (1) || Yankee Stadium || 33,091 || 78–58
|- style="background:#fbb;" 
| 137 || September 6 || Blue Jays || 0–8 || Ryu (13–8) || Taillon (8–6) || — || Yankee Stadium || 31,196 || 78–59
|- style="background:#fbb;" 
| 138 || September 7 || Blue Jays || 1–5 || Matz (11–8) || Cole (14–7) || — || Yankee Stadium || 30,164 || 78–60
|- style="background:#fbb;" 
| 139 || September 8 || Blue Jays || 3–6 || Richards (6–2) || Holmes (6–3) || Romano (16) || Yankee Stadium || 25,873 || 78–61
|- style="background:#fbb;" 
| 140 || September 9 || Blue Jays || 4–6 || Berríos (11–7) || Romano (0–2) || — || Yankee Stadium || 30,112 || 78–62
|- style="background:#fbb;" 
| 141 || September 10 || @ Mets || 3–10 || Megill (3–4) || Montgomery (5–6) || — || Citi Field || 37,288 || 78–63
|- style="background:#bfb;" 
| 142 || September 11 || @ Mets || 8–7 || Holmes (7–3) || May (7–3) || Chapman (26) || Citi Field || 43,144 || 79–63
|- style="background:#fbb;" 
| 143 || September 12 || @ Mets || 6–7 || Lugo (4–2) || Green (7–7) || Díaz (29) || Citi Field || 33,805 || 79–64
|- style="background:#bfb;"
| 144 || September 13 || Twins || 6–5  || Holmes (8–3) || Garza Jr. (1–3) || — || Yankee Stadium || 31,528 || 80–64
|- style="background:#bfb;" 
| 145 || September 14 || @ Orioles || 7–2 || Cole (15–7) || Wells (1–3) || — || Camden Yards || 10,235 || 81–64
|- style="background:#bfb;" 
| 146 || September 15 || @ Orioles || 4–3 || Peralta (5–3) || Wells (2–3) || Chapman (27) || Camden Yards || 10,402 || 82–64
|- style="background:#fbb;" 
| 147 || September 16 || @ Orioles || 2–3  || Sulser (5–4) || Peralta (5–4) || — || Camden Yards || 20,164 || 82–65
|- style="background:#bfb;"
| 148 || September 17 || Indians || 8–0 || Kluber (5–3) || Plesac (10–6) || — || Yankee Stadium || 31,403 || 83–65
|- style="background:#fbb;" 
| 149 || September 18 || Indians || 3–11 || Civale (11–4) || Gil (1–1) || — || Yankee Stadium || 39,088 || 83–66
|- style="background:#fbb;" 
| 150 || September 19 || Indians || 1–11 || Morgan (3–7) || Cole (15–8) || — || Yankee Stadium || 34,110 || 83–67
|- style="background:#bfb;" 
| 151 || September 20 || Rangers || 4–3 || Green (8–7) || Alexy (2–1) || Chapman (28) || Yankee Stadium || 22,160 || 84–67
|- style="background:#bfb;" 
| 152 || September 21 || Rangers || 7–1 || Montgomery (6–6) || Dunning (5–9) || — || Yankee Stadium || 23,335 || 85–67
|- style="background:#bfb;" 
| 153 || September 22 || Rangers || 7–3 || Green (9–7) || Patton (1–2) || — || Yankee Stadium || 25,170 || 86–67
|- style="background:#bfb;" 
| 154 || September 24 || @ Red Sox || 8–3 || Cole (16–8) || Eovaldi (10–9) || — || Fenway Park || 36,026 || 87–67
|- style="background:#bfb;" 
| 155 || September 25 || @ Red Sox || 5–3 || Severino (1–0) || Houck (1–5) || Chapman (29) || Fenway Park || 36,103 || 88–67
|- style="background:#bfb;" 
| 156 || September 26 || @ Red Sox || 6–3 || Green (10–7) || Richards (7–8) || Chapman (30) || Fenway Park || 36,312 || 89–67
|- style="background:#bfb;" 
| 157 || September 28 || @ Blue Jays || 7–2 || King (1–4) || Ryu (13–10) || — || Rogers Centre || 28,769 || 90–67
|- style="background:#fbb;" 
| 158 || September 29 || @ Blue Jays || 5–6 || Cimber (3–4) || Holmes (8–4) || Romano (22) || Rogers Centre || 29,601 || 90–68
|- style="background:#bfb;" 
| 159 || September 30 || @ Blue Jays || 6–2 || King (2–4) || Ray (13–7) || — || Rogers Centre || 29,659 || 91–68
|-

|- style="background:#fbb;" 
| 160 || October 1 || Rays || 3–4 || Head (2–0) || Cortés Jr. (2–3) || Kittredge (8) || Yankee Stadium || 41,469 || 91–69
|- style="background:#fbb;" 
| 161 || October 2 || Rays || 2–12 || Patiño (5–3) || Montgomery (6–7) || — || Yankee Stadium || 41,648 || 91–70
|- style="background:#bfb;"
| 162 || October 3 || Rays || 1–0 || Chapman (6–4) || Fleming (10–8) || — || Yankee Stadium || 40,409 || 92–70
|-

No-hitters

Grand slams

Postseason

Postseason Game log

|- style="background:#fbb;" 
| 1 || October 5 || @ Red Sox || Fenway Park || 2–6 || Eovaldi (1−0) || Cole (0−1) || — || 38,324 || 0–1 
|-

Postseason rosters

| style="text-align:left" |
Pitchers: 30 Joely Rodríguez 35 Clay Holmes 40 Luis Severino 43 Jonathan Loáisiga 45 Gerrit Cole 54 Aroldis Chapman 55 Domingo Germán 57 Chad Green 58 Wandy Peralta 63 Lucas Luetge 65 Nestor Cortés Jr. 73 Michael King 
Catchers: 24 Gary Sánchez 62 Rob Brantly 66 Kyle Higashioka
Infielders: 12 Rougned Odor 14 Tyler Wade 25 Gleyber Torres 29 Gio Urshela 48 Anthony Rizzo 71 Andrew Velazquez
Outfielders: 11 Brett Gardner 13 Joey Gallo 22 Greg Allen 99 Aaron Judge 
Designated hitters: 27 Giancarlo Stanton 
|- valign="top"

Roster

Awards and honors

Farm system

References

External links
2021 New York Yankees at Baseball Reference
2021 New York Yankees season
2021 New York Yankees schedule

New York Yankees seasons
New York Yankees
New York Yankees
2020s in the Bronx